Kira Lynn Harris (born 1963) is an African-American mixed-media artist who currently lives and teaches in New York City.

Life
Kira Lynn Harris was born in 1963 in Los Angeles, California. Harris received her BA in Studio Art from the University of California at Santa Cruz, and then earned her MFA in Art from the California Institute of the Arts in 1998.

Career 
In addition to multiple solo and group exhibitions in the United States, Italy, Canada, and South Africa, Harris has also served as an artist-in-residence at the Studio Museum in Harlem (2001–2002), the Center for Photography at Woodstock (2004), St. Mary's College of Maryland (2005), Omi International Art Center, Lower Manhattan Cultural Council, and the Delaware Center for Contemporary Art (2006). Her work has been exhibited at many galleries, including MoMA PS1, Miami Art Museum, Bruno Marina Gallery, and the Delaware Center for the Contemporary Arts. She has participated in the following group exhibitions: Blues for Smoke (MoCA and Whitney Museum), Black Light (White Noise Contemporary Art Museum and Freestyle Studio Museum Harlem).

Her work has been reviewed in The New York Times, Time Out New York, and the Los Angeles Times, among others. Critics have described her work as "minimal," making use of installation, drawing, photography, and video to express "formal concerns of space, light and the phenomenological with issues of individual subjectivity." She has also made use of reflective surfaces like mirror or silver leaf to highlight the architecture of space. Of her work, Harris explains, "My projects often provide a disorienting encounter for the viewer: in my installations I am concerned with destabilization and re-orientation. To achieve this I often create architectural and environmental interventions – by using light and reflective surfaces; by inverting subject and object or figure and ground; and/or by reversing up and down, exterior and interior."

Harris has stated that her work is influenced by artists like James Turrell, Mark Rothko, and the Hudson River School painters. She also explained, "A lot of my interest in light came from being from Los Angeles, where the light is just everywhere. You have these huge expanses of sky". She has also cited science fiction, as well as films and cityscapes like Metropolis and Mad Max as influences.

Works 
 Interstices, 1997 Rosamund Fesen Gallery and at GAle GAtes et Al 
 96 Degrees in the Shade, 2001
 Void, River, Nocturne, 2001
 Falling Up, 2003 
 Waterfall, 2005 MoMa PS1 
 Crescendo, 2006
 Untitled (Pyramid), 2007 Contemporary Arts Museum Houston.
 Just Beyond Reality, 2009 CUE Art Foundation in New York City.
 The Block, 2011

Prizes and awards 
In 1998 Harris won the Lorser Feitelson Emerging Artist award. In 2003 she won the Harvestworks artist-in-residence video production grant.

Personal life 
Harris now resides in New York City, New York and teaches art to both high schoolers and college students. She has been an assistant professor in the Department of Art and Music at John Jay College, as well as a part of the Art Faculty at Nightingale-Bamford School.

References

External links
 Review of 2015 show in The Austin Chronicle
 Kira Lynn Harris discusses The Block at Studio Museum in Harlem
 Contemporary Wing profile of Harris

American contemporary painters
Living people
American women painters
African-American contemporary artists
American contemporary artists
American women video artists
American video artists
20th-century American painters
1963 births
20th-century American women artists
21st-century American women artists
California Institute of the Arts alumni
University of California, Santa Cruz alumni
20th-century African-American women
20th-century African-American painters
21st-century African-American women
21st-century African-American artists